A Different View is a Spanish drama television series created by Josep Cister and Jaime Vaca. Starring Macarena García, Patricia López Arnaiz, Ana Wagener and Cecilia Freire among others, the show is set in 1920s Seville and it conveys a feminist message. The two seasons of the show originally aired from 25 April 2018 to 15 July 2019 on La 1.

Plot 
Set in an academy for young ladies in Seville in the 1920s, A Different View shows a teaching center clinging to an unwavering way of doing things and conditioned by the traditions of the city and those years. All this universe and its pillars wobble with the arrival of a new teacher who has a very different way of seeing things and who has a secret objective directly related to the academy. The search for the own voice of a group of adult and young women will be the destiny of the protagonists.

Topics covered 

Each chapter in both seasons deals with problems and themes that occurred in 1920. It displays the history of Elena Maseras and the teaching in the female sector, to learn about the role of women and sport over the years, the importance of mutual support among women to understand feminism as a collective movement, the need for all women to tell their stories so that no one else can tell them for them, discover feminist artworks such as "El pelele" by Francisco de Goya, recognize that sexuality goes beyond male pleasure, self-knowledge of the female sexual organ, to value self-love, mental health and to understand racism.

Cast and characters 
Source:

First season (2018)

Main cast 
 Macarena García - Manuela Martín Casado
 Patricia López Arnaiz - Teresa Blanco Sánchez
 Ana Wagener - Luisa Fernández Mayoral
 Cecilia Freire - Ángela López Castaño

Secondary cast 
 Gloria Muñoz - Doña Manuela Casado García (Episode 1 - Episode 5, Episode 7 - Episode 8, Episode 11, Episode 13)
 Carlos Olalla - Don Pascual Martín (Episode 1 - Episode 4, Episode 7 - Episode 8, Episode 13)
 Begoña Vargas - Roberta Luna Miñambres
 Lucía Díez - Margarita Ortega-Sánchez Camaño y López de Carrizosa
 Carla Campra - Flavia Cardesa González
 Paula de la Nieta - Macarena Panduro Alén
 Abril Montilla - María Jesús Junio Crespo
 Elena Gallardo - Candela Megía Rodas
 Juanlu González - Ramón
 Álvaro Mel - Tomás Peralta García de Blas (Episode 1 - Episode 5, Episode 7 - Episode 13)
 Pepa Gracia - Paula Alén (Episode 3, Episode 5, Episode 7, Episode 9, Episode 12 - Episode 13)
 Jordi Coll - Martín Arteaga Gómez-Berzosa (Episode 3 - Episode 4, Episode 7 - Episode 8, Episode 11 - Episode 13)
 Alejandro Sigüenza - David (Episode 3, Episode 5, Episode 9, Episode 11 - Episode 13)
 José Pastor - Rafael "Rafita" Peralta García de Blas (Episode 1 - Episode 4, Episode 7 - Episode 8)
 José Luis Barquero - Álvaro Peralta García de Blas (Episode 1 - Episode 4, Episode 7 - Episode 8)
 Celia Freijeiro - María Antonia Miñambres (Episode 5 - Episode 6, Episode 8, Episode 13)
 Filipe Duarte - Vanildo "Nildo" Zacarías de Azevedo (Episode 1 - Episode 6, Episode 13)

Episodic cast

Second season (2019)

Main cast 

 Macarena García - Manuela Martín Casado
 Patricia López Arnaiz - Teresa Blanco Sánchez
 Ana Wagener - Luisa Fernández Mayoral
 Melina Matthews - Carmen Lara

Secondary cast 

 Carla Campra - Flavia Cardesa González
 Lucía Díez - Margarita Ortega-Sánchez Camaño y López de Carrizosa
 Begoña Vargas - Roberta Luna Miñambres
 Abril Montilla - María Jesús Junio Crespo
 Paula de la Nieta - Macarena Panduro Alén
 Elena Gallardo - Candela Megía Rodas
 Dariam Coco - Inés
 Gloria Muñoz - Doña Manuela Casado García (Episode 14/1, Episode 16/3 - Episode 21/8)
 Jordi Coll - Martín Arteaga Gómez-Berzosa (Episodio 14/1, Episode 16/3 - Episode 19/6, Episode 21/8)
 Álvaro Mel - Tomás Peralta García de Blas
 Juanlu González - Ramón
 Javier Mora - Don Rafael Peralta (Episode 14/1 - Episode 15/2, Episode 17/4, Episode 19/6 - Episode 21/8)
 César Vicente - Elías
 José Pastor - Rafael "Rafita" Peralta García de Blas (Episode 15/2 - Episode 19/6, Episode 21/8)
 José Luis Barquero - Álvaro Peralta García de Blas (Episode 15/2 - Episode 16/3, Episode 21/8)
 Carlos Olalla - Don Pascual Martín (Episode 17/4 - Episode 20/7)
 Paco Mora - Arcadio Pérez Fernández (Episode 20/7)
 Raúl Ferrando - Enrique Hidalgo (Episode 15/2, Episode 17/4 - Episode 20/7)
 Cecilia Freire - Ángela López Castaño (Episode 14/1, Episode 19/6)
 Pepa Gracia - Paula Alén (Episode 19/6)
 Javier Ambrossi - Benito Padilla (Episode 16/3)
 Javier Calvo - Jorge Merlot (Episode 16/3)
 Joaquín Notario - Vicente Martínez (Episode 14/1 - Episode 16/3, Episode 18/5; Episode 20/7 - Episode 21/8)
 Celia Freijeiro - María Antonia Miñambres (Episode 14/1, Episode 17/4)

Episodic cast

Production and release 
Created by Josep Cister and Jaime Vaca, La otra mirada was produced by RTVE in collaboration with Boomerang TV. It was known as Alma Mater during pre-production. The episodes of season 1 were directed by Luis Santamaría, Mar Olid, Fernando González Molina, Miguel del Arco and Pablo Guerrero. Shooting locations included Seville, Madrid, Guadalajara and Toledo.

Although the series' premiere was scheduled for the northern hemisphere Summer of 2018, Televisión Española (TVE) decided to bring it forward on 25 April. The last episode aired on 25 July 2018. The season averaged a 9.0% audience share and 1,418,000 viewers.

By October 2018, RTVE decided to renew the series for a second and a final season of 8 episodes, despite the fact that its audience ratings were unimpressive. It however earned critical acclaim. Melina Matthews and Dariam Coco, as well as Joaquín Notario and César Vicente joined the cast for the new season. Credited directors in season 2 included Luis Santamaría, Pablo Guerrero and Carlos Navarro, whereas the writing team was formed by Alba Lucio, Irene Rodríguez, Ana Muñiz da Cunha and Tatiana Rodríguez. The broadcasting run spanned from 27 May 2019 to 15 July 2019.

RTVE reached agreements with platforms such as IVI and Walter Presents to broadcast the series in international markets.

Season 1 (2018)

Season 2 (2019)

Awards and nominations 

|-
| rowspan = "5" align = "center" | 2018 || rowspan = "2" | 20th Iris Awards || Best Production || Josep Cister, Aitor Montánchez, Luis Santamaría and Mª Ángeles Caballero ||  || rowspan = "2" | 
|-
| Best Actress || Patricia López Arnaiz || 
|-
| rowspan = "3" | 6th  || colspan = "2" | Best Drama Series ||  || rowspan = "3" | 
|-
| Best Screenplay || María López Castaño, Alba Lucio Calderón, Mario Parra Ortiz, Josep Cister and Jaime Vaca || 
|-
| Best Actress || Macarena García || 
|}

References

External links 
 
 La otra mirada en FilmAffinity.

Television series set in the 1920s
2018 Spanish television series debuts
2019 Spanish television series endings
2010s Spanish drama television series
La 1 (Spanish TV channel) network series
Period television series
Television shows set in Seville
Spanish LGBT-related television shows
Television shows filmed in Spain
Television series by Boomerang TV